Mesoereis is a genus of longhorn beetles of the subfamily Lamiinae, containing the following species:

 Mesoereis horianus (Breuning & Ohbayashi, 1966)
 Mesoereis koshunensis Matsushita, 1933
 Mesoereis yunnanus Breuning, 1974

References

Mesosini